Joshua George Dawkin (born 16 January 1992) is an English-born Welsh footballer who plays as a midfielder for St Ives Town, having signed for them in the summer of 2016.

Career
Born in St Ives, Cambridgeshire, Dawkin has represented Wales at under-17 and 19 levels. Although born in England, he qualifies to play for Wales through his mother: "My mum was born in Wales, though she only lived there for a couple of years because my grandad was in the RAF."

He made his professional debut for Norwich City aged 17, on 6 October 2009, in a match against Gillingham in the Football League Trophy.

Dawkin began a one-month loan spell with Conference National side Cambridge United on 9 March 2012.

On 12 July 2012 Dawkin joined Conference National side Braintree Town F.C. along with former Norwich City F.C. defender Sam Habergham.

After a spell with Cambridge City, Dawkin joined Southern Premier Division side Dunstable Town in the summer of 2014 following their promotion the previous season.

Spells followed for Biggleswade Town and St Neots Town, with whom Dawkin spent the second half of the 2015–16 season. In the summer of 2016 he moved to newly promoted Southern Premier Division side St Ives Town.

Style of play
Dawkin expressed his strengths as a footballer as "running with the ball and dribbling", adding "I'm nowhere near as good as him but I'd like to model myself on Cristiano Ronaldo - I'd like to try and play like him."

References

External links

Josh Dawkin profile at the Norwich City website

1992 births
Living people
People from St Ives, Cambridgeshire
English footballers
Welsh footballers
Wales youth international footballers
Association football midfielders
Norwich City F.C. players
Kettering Town F.C. players
Cambridge United F.C. players
Braintree Town F.C. players
Lowestoft Town F.C. players
Cambridge City F.C. players
Dunstable Town F.C. players
Biggleswade Town F.C. players
St Neots Town F.C. players
St Ives Town F.C. players
National League (English football) players
Southern Football League players